The Girl Who Ran Wild is a 1922 American comedy-drama film directed by Rupert Julian. It is a black and white silent film released by Universal which is based on the 1863 novella M’liss: An Idyll of Red Mountain by Bret Harte. It is a remake of the 1918 film M’Liss. The film was written by George C. Hull and features cast such as Gladys Walton (as M’liss), Marc Robbins (“Bummer” Smith), and Vernon Steele (The Schoolmaster). It is a western melodrama which was released on October 9, 1922. It was filmed in Seven Oaks, California.

Plot
As described in a film magazine, Melissa Bummer (Walton), whom everyone called "Old Man Bummer's Wildcat," told the world that she could take care of herself after her Dad (Robbins) died and left her alone in a shack in the hills. Shabbily clad, barefoot, her hair knotted and uncombed, M'Liss scorned the girls from the city who had Mamas and always had ribbons in their hair. But this was before the new Schoolmaster (Steele) came, and she began to realize how sadly ignorant she was. Of course, he was handsome and well groomed. M'Liss was not surprised by that, but she could believe her ears when he told her that he loved her and wanted her to go away with him. The little wildcat of the mountains began to earnestly study her textbooks, to wear becoming clothes supplied by her two guardians, and awoke to all that she had been missing before in her solitary existence in her father's shack. One thing that M'Liss did not have to learn in school was the winsome ways of a maid to win a man. This is where her eternal feminine cropped out to beat the village belle to the goal.

Cast
 Gladys Walton as M'liss
 Marc Robbins as 'Bummer' Smith
 Vernon Steele as The Schoolmaster
 Joseph J. Dowling as Calaveras John (credited as Joseph Dowling)
 William Burress as Johnny Cake
 Al Hart as Preacher
 Nelson McDowell as Deacon McSnagley
 Lloyd Whitlock as Jack Velvet
 Lucille Ricksen as Clytie

References

External links

1922 films
American silent feature films
American black-and-white films
1920s American films
1920s English-language films
Silent American comedy-drama films